JDS Makigumo (DD-114) was the second ship of Yamagumo-class destroyers.

Construction and career
Makigumo was laid down at Uraga Dock Company Uraga Shipyard on 10 June 1964 and launched on 26 July 1967. She was commissioned on 19 March 1966.

On 1 December 1977, the 21st Escort Corps was reorganized under the 3rd Escort Corps group.

In 1985, participated in a practicing voyage to the ocean.

On 20 February 1987, the 21st Escort Corps was reorganized under the Sasebo District Force.

On 20 June 1991, she was reclassified as a training vessel and her registration number changed to TV-3507. She was transferred to the 1st Training Squadron and her home port was transferred to Kure. The remodeling work to a training ship was carried out from 28 June to 24 October of the same year, and the ASROC launcher was used as a trainee auditorium (accommodating 36 people), and a part of the officer's bedroom was for female SDF personnel. It was remodeled to 14 people).

She was removed from the register on 1 August 1995.

Gallery

Citations

References 

1967 ships
Yamagumo-class destroyers
Ships built by Uraga Dock Company